Shanghai Longhua Airport (上海龙华机场) , then called Shanghai Lunghwa Airport, was a converted general aviation airport and PLAAF airfield located south of downtown Shanghai, China, on the bank of the Huangpu River. It opened in the early 1920s and served as the city's airport until the 1950s when Shanghai Hongqiao International Airport opened. Thereafter, it was one of two general aviation airports serving Shanghai and also served as an emergency landing site for police, fire and rescue operations southwest of the city. The airport was eventually closed at 1966, and the airport grounds were slowly built over though a period of between 1993 and 2016.

History 
The site began airfield operations in late 1922 under the Beiyang government.

In the early 1930s, the main, semi circular Art Deco terminal was built, along with the main ATC tower on the top of the main terminal, which still exists today, making it the last structure still remaining on what was once the airport.

In the 1930s-1940s, during its golden age, the airport was known as the most popular airport for amphibious aircraft and the biggest airport of the Far East at the time.

After the Battle of Shanghai, Imperial Japanese Airways operated services from Longhua to Fukuoka and Taipei during the late 1930s and early 1940s. Additionally, the tarmac was expanded to accommodate at least 100 aircraft (before 1937, only 10 airplanes could be parked at the tarmac), 2 gravel runways were added, making Longhua Airport one of China's first airport with more than one runway built.

After the end of World War II, basic equipment such as power supply, radar, and communication systems were renovated and improved. Hence, the airport became a hub for China National Aviation Corporation (CNAC), as well as a famous stopover for many international airlines flying to Hong Kong, China, or Japan. Northwest Orient Airlines began service to Longhua in 1947, stopping there en-route from the United States and Japan to the Philippines, and flew this route until suspending service in 1949. Hong Kong Airways began scheduled service to Hong Kong in 1948.

The People's Liberation Army took over the facility in 1949 following the Kuomintang Civil War, and maintained it as a civil airport until 1966 when all remaining passenger services were moved to Hongqiao.

A flying school used the old hangars of the airport. A single runway (18/36) is now built over and the old terminal in now surrounded by apartments. Although the runway no longer exists and a helipad is built nearby, an Ilysuhin Il-14 (formerly CAAC Airlines), an Antonov An-24 (formerly China Eastern Airlines), and 2 Chinese built Antonov An-2 (formerly used as a general aviation in the 1960s) still existed on the tarmac, although they are no longer usable.

KLM's first flight ever to Shanghai occurred in 1948, when it landed at Longhua after stopovers in Bangkok and Djakarta. Services halted in the Communist revolution and resumed again in 1996, which was then already operating at Hongqiao. Today, as Pudong is already opened back then (since 1999), it still operates daily flights from Amsterdam to Shanghai.

Former airlines and destinations 
Before 1949, several international airlines operated at this airport, which is biggest in the Orient before being surpassed by others. It was taken over by the People's Liberation Army and still served as civil airport for CAAC until 1966.

Gallery

Accidents and Incidents 

 On 16 December 1946, a CNAC DC-3 struck 3 parked aircraft, killing five.
 On the night of Christmas 1946, what was known as Shanghai's Black Christmas, a CNAC Curtiss C-46, enroute from Chongqing Baishiyi, crashed on approach near Longhua Airport in fog due to poor lighting on runways and poor visibility. Of 36 passengers on board, only 5 survived. On the same day, two DC-3s also crashed on approach in the same city, but both were destined for Jiangwan Airport. A total of 61 were killed in 3 respective aircraft, and a person on the ground.

References

External links

Photos of Shanghai - Longhua Airport (ZSSL) at Airliners.net

Airports in Shanghai
Defunct airports in China
Xuhui District
Buildings and structures completed in the 1930s